Telipna rufilla, the Niger Delta telipna, is a butterfly in the family Lycaenidae. It is found in Nigeria. The habitat consists of forests.

References

Endemic fauna of Nigeria
Butterflies described in 1901
Poritiinae
Taxa named by Henley Grose-Smith